Château-Chinon (Ville) is a commune in the Nièvre department in France. It is a sub-prefecture of the department.

The villages around the town are grouped in another commune named Château-Chinon (Campagne).

François Mitterrand (1916–1996), President of France from 1981 to 1995, was the mayor of Château-Chinon from 1959 to 1981.

Twin towns
 Cortona, Italy
 Timbuktu, Mali
 Villeréal, France

See also
Communes of the Nièvre department
Parc naturel régional du Morvan

References

Communes of Nièvre
Subprefectures in France
Nivernais
Nièvre communes articles needing translation from French Wikipedia